The Arrondissement of Thuin is one of the seven administrative arrondissements in the Walloon province of Hainaut, Belgium.

The Administrative Arrondissement of Thuin consists of the following municipalities:

Since 2019

 Anderlues
 Beaumont
 Chimay
 Erquelinnes
 Froidchapelle
 Ham-sur-Heure-Nalinnes

 Lobbes
 Merbes-le-Château
 Momignies
 Sivry-Rance
 Thuin

Before 2019

 Anderlues
 Beaumont
 Binche
 Chimay
 Erquelinnes
 Estinnes
 Froidchapelle

 Ham-sur-Heure-Nalinnes
 Lobbes
 Merbes-le-Château
 Momignies
 Morlanwelz
 Sivry-Rance
 Thuin

The municipalities of Binche, Estinnes and Morlanwelz are detached from the Arrondissement on January 1, 2019 to create the new Arrondissement of La Louvière.

References

Thuin